Charmaine Porter (born 26 June 1995) is a British former professional racing cyclist, who was part of UCI Women's Continental Team , during the COVID-19 pandemic-disrupted 2020 season. Throughout the majority of her cycling career, Porter combined cycling with a career in the British Army, reaching a rank of lance corporal.

Porter retired from cycling at the end of the 2020 season.

References

External links

1995 births
Living people
British female cyclists
Place of birth missing (living people)
Women in the British Army
British women police officers
21st-century British women